The Tunisia women's national handball team, nicknamed Les Aigles de Carthage (The Eagles of Carthage or The Carthage Eagles), is the national handball team of Tunisia. It is governed by the Tunisian Handball Federation and takes part in international handball competitions.

Competitive record
 Champions   Runners-up   Third place   Fourth place  

Red border color indicates tournament was held on home soil.

World Championship

African Championship

African Games

Mediterranean Games

Pan Arab Games

Other records

Spain international tournament
  Third Place (1):  2022

Current squad
Squad for the 2021 World Women's Handball Championship.

Head coach: Moez Ben Amor

See also
Tunisia men's national handball team
Tunisia women's national junior handball team
Tunisia women's national youth handball team
Tunisia women's national beach handball team

References

External links

IHF profile

Women's national handball teams
National team
National sports teams of Tunisia